Shaunna Elizabeth Hall (born July 28, 1963) is an American composer and musician from the San Francisco Bay Area. As guitarist, she was a founding member of the band 4 Non Blondes and is currently a member of George Clinton's Parliament-Funkadelic.

Early life
Hall played trumpet in school, studying under Jon Simms, the founder of the San Francisco Gay Freedom Day Marching Band and Twirling Corps, at Benjamin Franklin Intermediate School in Daly City, California. She started taking the guitar seriously as a teenager at Serramonte High School, and studied songwriting at the Blue Bear School of Music in San Francisco with Bonnie Hayes.

1980s
Hall joined her first band, The Crash Puppies, in the early 1980s. In the late 1980s, she and bassist Christa Hillhouse formed Cool and Unusual Punishment, a new wave duo. Later, they joined, along with drummer Wanda Day, The Lesbian Snake Charmers, led by singer Jai Jai Noire.

Hall met vocalist Linda Perry, and when The Lesbian Snake Charmers broke up, they co-founded the alternative rock group 4 Non Blondes with  Perry, Hillhouse, and Day in 1989.

1990s

In 1990, 4 Non Blondes won the SF Weekly Award (Wammies) for Best Rock Band. Bigger, Better, Faster, More! by  Interscope Records was released in 1992 and was the only studio album released by the band. It includes performances and five compositions by Hall ("Morphine & Chocolate", "Spaceman", and others). The album peaked at number 11 on the Billboard Top 200. "Spaceman" was released as a single in 1993 and peaked at number 39 on the Billboard Mainstream Rock Tracks chart. Hall left the band in 1992 during the recording of "Bigger, Better, Faster, More!" over musical differences with the band as well as with the producer. The album was completed with session guitarist Louis Metoyer.

Hall and Pat Wilder subsequently founded Bad Dog Play Dead in 1992. The all-female ensemble played funk, rock, country and pop songs written largely by Hall and Wilder, and the group reunited Hall and 4 Non Blondes drummer Wanda Day. They recorded a demo, engineered and mixed by Garry Crieman at Hyde Street Studios, San Francisco. Janis Tanaka played bass on the demo but did not join the group. The band played live in San Francisco for several months until the permanent disability of Day in December 1992.

Hall played as a part of the agro-core hard rock band The Alcohol of Fame (named by studio engineer Garry Crieman) from 1993-95. The group began as an ensemble Hall put together to perform a benefit for Day at the I-Beam in San Francisco in early 1993. The band changed line-ups, with the core trio of Hall, Crash and Spingola finally teaming with drummer Becky Wreck from the Lunachicks later that year. Their first official performance was at Female Trouble's "The Dykemare Before Christmas" in December 1993. With the addition of bassist Erica Liss of MDC in early 1994, the lineup made a six-song demo, Mendocino Demo 1994, and played the New Music Seminar in New York, NY followed by an east coast summer tour in 1994.

Though Wreck remained on the east Coast, the core trio of Crash, Hall and Spingola returned to San Francisco. Drummer Peter French and a series of bass players including Dennis Dismore and the late Warner Harrison joined The Alcohol of Fame in 1995. The group recorded a second demo in the spring of 1995 at Gush Studios in Oakland, California. Warner announced his departure from the band only weeks after finishing the demo, and the group disbanded.

In 1996, Hall and Tribe 8, Bay Area queercore pioneers, joined Nirvana, Soundgarden, Joan Jett, The Gits, and others on the Home Alive! Compilation. The project raised funds and awareness for self-defense education for women in honor of Mia Zapata, the singer of The Gits who was beaten and murdered while walking home.

Hall appears on Frat Pig and another song from the Tribe 8 CD Fist City on Alternative Tentacles Records. She co-produced Tribe 8's Role Models for America released in 1998 on Alternative Tentacles.

Throughout the 1990s, Hall played with the theatrical six-piece group The Eric McFadden Experience. In 1998, the group received the SF Weekly Award (Wammies) for Best Americana Band and released Our Revels Now are Ended. The CD includes one Hall composition, "Macaroon", which also appeared on an early 4 Non Blondes demo.

2000s
Alien Lovestock's 2000 CD Planet of Fish includes the composition "Alien Love" co-written by Hall, Eric McFadden and George Clinton.

Hall composed eight tracks with Storm, Inc. for the independent release The Calm Years in April 2001. Storm, Inc. started in the summer of 1999 when Hall sat in with singer Storm Large as a support guitarist for acoustic gigs. Hall and Storm, Inc. wrote and created The Calm Years. and toured the US west coast following its release.

As a sound designer, Hall helped create the first online video game developed by Shockwave in 2000. Tamale Loco is now available in the Shockwave Favorites Vol. 1 game bundle or as a standalone download at Shockwave.com.

In the summer of 2001, she played with Dog Ass, a trio with Los Angeles drummer Becky Wreck and bassist Christy Michel. Formed specifically to play a Breast Cancer Awareness Benefit presented by Loudithfaire, a festival celebrating lesser-known women in rock, the trio gave a few shows in San Francisco and Los Angeles before Hall moved to Barcelona, Spain in 2002.

Hall wrote, produced, and directed a short film called The Beauty of Betrayal in May 2002. Brick Seriously and Hall recorded the video in San Francisco. It features her composition Beauty Sleeps recorded in San Francisco and Los Angeles with drummer Kevin Carnes, EricMcFadden Experience members Sam Bass, Ben Barnes and Paula O'Rourke. Janis Tanaka plays the saw on the instrumental. Hall appears in the film along with actress Natalie Richie.

In July 2002, Hall began touring with George Clinton and Parliament-Funkadelic. Since then, she has played on several US, Canadian and European tours as well as dates abroad. She was the monitor engineer from 2002–2004, and the P-Funk Live at the 2004 Montreaux Jazz Festival DVD credits her engineering work. She became the first official female guitarist of P-Funk in 2007.

Hall and Dutch artist Margot van Ham shared an art/music studio in Barcelona, Spain from 2004 to 2006. In 2004, Hall released a video called The Third Eye. Van Ham produced the video in 2004 with a song Hall wrote with Paul Hill and Clip Payne of P-Funk in 2002. The video was released in 2006 as a part of Hall's multimedia project, Electrofunkadelica: e3+FUNKnth = music for the body, mind & soul.

In 2007, Hall appeared on the BBC program The 100 Most Annoying Pop Songs We Hate To Love, which featured the 4 Non Blondes song "What's Up? at number 91 on the list.

Hall joined a number of artists for former artist liaison and backstage manager Tiffany Travalent's benefit at 12 Galaxies in San Francisco in 2007. Led by Eric McFadden, a large group of musicians including Bernie Worrell (Parliament-Funkadelic), Dawn Silva (Brides of Funkenstein/Sly and the Family Stone), Jerry Harrison (Talking Heads), Pete Sears, Carol Hernandez, and The Meters' drummer Ziggy Modeliste gave their time to benefit Travalent, who suffers from severe chronic pain, is unable to work, and had large outstanding medical bills. A DVD of the event was released with footage from the show and related content.

Hall earned two engineering credits in 2008—the first for Clinton's vocals on the song Heads Will Roll, for Lee "Scratch" Perry's Return of the Super Ape. The second, George Clinton and his Gangsters of Love, charted on both the Billboard R&B and Independent Charts.

Current projects
Hall returned to the United States in 2005, and continues to tour the world as a guitarist with George Clinton and Parliament-Funkadelic in The P-Funk Allstars. She became an official band member in 2007 after five years of touring as a part-time player, monitor engineer, and crew member.

She released a solo project, Electrofunkadelica, in 2006. She wrote, produced, and recorded most of the project on a Macintosh laptop with a portable studio while touring the world with P-Funk on the road between 2002 and 2005, and the tracks feature many P-Funk members and musician friends. The 2006 release Electrofunkadelica: e3+FUNKnth = music for the body, mind & soul, is a collection of audio recordings and three videos. It consists of contemporary music and projected visual imagery performances described as "containing some social and political messages, some emotional and inspirational, and some are just plain fun". The Electrofunkadelica live performances feature Hall on guitar, electronic sources including looping samplers, Kevin Carnes on drums, Stephan G. as VJ, and occasional guest vocalists or instrumentalists. Projected visual imagery plays a large part in the show, with VJ mixing, animation and film.

She is currently creating the next Electrofunkadelica collection, which will again feature many musical guests and the recording debut of drag king character BB Kink. Hall created BB Kink as an Electro-GoGo-Love-Blues guitar player. She introduced the character in late 2008 with performances in Barcelona at Sala Monasterio and San Francisco at Anon Salon.

Interests and affiliations
Hall was a panelist for the 2000 and 2005 ROCKRGRL Music Conference, and has been a volunteer performer for Bread and Roses since 1997. She is a member of ASCAP.

Discography

George Clinton
George Clinton and His Gangsters of Love
Shanachie - 2008
Engineer
Billboard R&B and Independent Charts

Lee "Scratch" Perry
Return of the Super Ape
Goldenlane Records - 2008
Engineer

Electrofunkadelica
e3+FUNKnth=music for the body, mind & soul
Make Music, Not War Records - 2006
Guitar, producer, songwriter and more

Eric McFadden
Dementia
Bad Reputation Records - 2006 Guitar

420 Funk Mob
Alive in Spain
wefunk 2kAD - 2004
Guitar
wefunkFM.com, wefunk records, and thefunkstore.com

Eric McFadden
Eric McFadden
2002
Guitar

Alien Lovestock
Planet of Fish
NMX Records - 2001
Songwriter

Storm, Inc.
The Calm Years
Gender Nectar Records - 2001
Guitar, BVs, songwriter

The Flying Other Bros.
Secondary
Producer/ Engineer
2000

The Flying Other Bros.
Demo & IPO
1999
Producer/ Engineer

Tribe 8
Role Models for Amerika
Alternative Tentacles - 1998
Guest Guitar, BVs, Co-Producer

The Eric McFadden Experience
Our Revels Now Are Ended
NMX Records - 1998
Guitar, Songwriter

Eric McFadden
Who's Laughing Now
NMX records - 1997
Guitar

Various Artists
Home Alive: The Art of Self Defense
Sony - 1996
Guitar

Tribe 8
Fist City
Alternative Tentacles - 1995
Guest guitar

Nicodemus
Dance Hall Giant
PSM Recordings - 1995
Guitar

The Alcohol of Fame
Gush Demo '95
Recorded at Gush Studios, Oakland, CA - 1995
Engineered by Allen Kraft, Mastered by Matt Murmen at Different Fur Studios, San Francisco
Songwriter, Guitar

The Alcohol of Fame
Mendocino Demo Session 1994
Recorded by Joey Mobile Sound - 1994
Songwriter, Guitar

Positive Sound Massive
"Sex & Guns" and "Unity"
PSM Records - 1993

Bad Dog Play Dead
Hyde St. Demo
Recorded by Garry Crieman at Hyde Street Studios, SF - 1992
Songwriter, Guitar

4 Non Blondes
Bigger, Better, Faster, More!
Interscope Records - 1992
Guitar, Songwriter

Video projects and performance videos
Second Wind

Beauty of Betrayal

The 3rd Eye

Going To The Hukilau

Good Thoughts, Bad Thoughts

Stellar Evolution

Details

George Clinton and the P-Funk All Stars - Cosmic Slop

Projects and groups

2008–present
BB KINK

2005–present
Electrofunkadelica

live band
Shaunna Hall - guitar, keyboards, vocals, & various machinery
Kevin Carnes - drums, samplers
VJ - Stephan G.
Other members, characters, and guests TBA

2004
The Third Eye Video
With Margot van Ham

2002–present
George Clinton & the P-Funk All-Stars

2002
''Beauty of Betrayal'' Video
With Brick Seriously

1999-2001
Storm, Inc.
Shaunna Hall - Guitars, bvs
Michael Cavaseno - Guitars, bvs
Storm Large - Vocals
Kevin Carnes - Drums
Ubidube Whitaker - Bass

1997-2005
The Eric McFadden Experience
Eric McFadden - guitar, vocals
Shaunna Hall - guitar, vocals
Paula O'Rourke - bass, vocals
Paulo Baldi - drums
Sam Bass - cello
Benjamin Barnes - violin

1993-1995
The Alcohol of Fame
Band Members 1993-1994

Shaunna Hall - Guitars, bvs
Cara Crash - Guitars, bvs
Steve 'Spit' Spingola - Vocals
Becky Wreck - Drums
Erica Liss - Bass

Band Members 1994-1995
Shaunna Hall - Guitars, bvs
Cara Crash - Guitars, bvs
Steve 'Spit' Spingola - Vocals
Warner Harrison - Bass
Peter French - Drums

1992-1993
Bad Dog Play Dead

studio band:
Shaunna Hall - guitar, vocals
Pat Wilder - guitar, vocals
Wanda Day - drums
Janis Tanaka - bass on recordings
Christi-on Crawford - Vocal on "Head Spin"

live band:
Shaunna Hall - guitar, vocals
Pat Wilder - guitar, vocals
Wanda Day - drums
Katherine Chase - bass, vocals
Anna Carney - keyboards and vocals and guitar
Christi-on Crawford -guest vocalist

1989-1992
4 Non Blondes

Christa Hillhouse, bass
Shaunna Hall, guitar
Wanda Day, drums
Linda Perry, vocals

1988-1989
Cool and Unusual Punishment

Shaunna Hall
Christa Hillhouse

Press and media
Early 4 Non Blondes Interview (July 1991) - Interview by Gary Indiana for Flipside Magazine
"Shaunna Hall gets in touch with her inner geek" - Interview by Danise von Rod on Loudithfaire.net
ROCKRGRL Interview: Issue #41 Sept/Oct - Cover: Kat Bjelland
Coverage from BAM Magazine on Storm, Inc. and "The Calm Years" features interviews with Shaunna, et al.
January 2008- WomensRadio.com Review of Electrofunkadelica by Brian Ball
August 2007 - Boise Weekly Review of Electrofunkadelica by Dam McMahon

References

External links
 Official website
 Four Non Blondes by Christa Hillhouse

African-American guitarists
American women composers
20th-century American composers
P-Funk members
Musicians from the San Francisco Bay Area
1963 births
Living people
20th-century American guitarists
4 Non Blondes members
20th-century women composers
20th-century American women guitarists
African-American women musicians